The 2010 NBA draft was held on June 24, 2010, at the Theatre at Madison Square Garden in New York City. The draft, which started at 7:00 pm Eastern Daylight Time (2300 UTC), was broadcast in the United States on ESPN. In this draft, National Basketball Association (NBA) teams took turns selecting amateur U.S. college basketball players and other eligible players, including international players. This draft set a record with five players being drafted from the same school in the first round. The players were John Wall (first), DeMarcus Cousins (fifth), Patrick Patterson (fourteenth), Eric Bledsoe (eighteenth), and Daniel Orton (twenty-ninth), all from the University of Kentucky. This draft also marked the second time an NBA D-League player was drafted, with the first case coming in 2008.

The Washington Wizards, who won the draft lottery on May 18, 2010, used their first overall draft pick to draft John Wall from the University of Kentucky. The Philadelphia 76ers, who also beat the odds in the draft lottery to obtain the second pick, selected Evan Turner from Ohio State University. The New Jersey Nets, who had the worst win–loss record in the previous season, used the third pick to select Derrick Favors from Georgia Tech.

The 2010 NBA draft is the last draft conducted at Madison Square Garden. The 2011 and 2012 NBA drafts were temporarily moved to Prudential Center in Newark, New Jersey, while the 2013 NBA draft would be held at the Barclays Center in Brooklyn, New York as the Garden underwent renovations during those summers of 2011–2013. After 2014, the draft would continue being hosted at the Barclays Center despite the renovations being done by the 2014 deadline.

This draft class had no Rookie of the Year because Blake Griffin, who was drafted first overall in the previous year's draft, missed his first season with an injury, but played in the 2010–2011 season and won the award.

Draft selections

Notable undrafted players

These players were not selected in the 2010 NBA Draft, but have played in at least one NBA game.

Eligibility

The basic eligibility rules for the draft are:
 All drafted players must be at least 19 years old during the calendar year of the draft. In terms of dates, players eligible for the 2010 draft must be born on or before December 31, 1991.
 Any player who is not an "international player", as defined in the collective bargaining agreement (CBA) between the league and its players union, must be at least one year removed from the graduation of his high school class. The CBA defines "international players" as players who permanently resided outside the U.S. for three years prior to the draft, did not complete high school in the U.S., and have never enrolled at a U.S. college or university.

The basic requirement for automatic eligibility for a U.S. player is the completion of his college eligibility. Players who meet the CBA definition of "international players" are automatically eligible if their 22nd birthday falls during or before the calendar year of the draft (i.e., born on or before December 31, 1988). U.S. players who were at least one year removed from their high school graduation and have played professionally with a team outside the NBA (either top-level basketball in another country, or minor-league basketball in North America) were also automatically eligible. Former high school player Latavious Williams meets these criteria, having graduated high school in 2009, skipped college basketball and then played professional basketball in NBA D-League.

A player who is not automatically eligible must declare his eligibility for the draft by notifying the NBA offices in writing no later than 60 days before the draft. For the 2010 draft, this date fell on April 25. Under NCAA rules taking effect with this draft, they only had until May 8 to withdraw from the draft and maintain their college eligibility. Previously, players who declared for the draft could withdraw as late as 10 days before the draft (the withdrawal deadline under the CBA) and still maintain college eligibility. This year, a total of 80 collegiate players and 23 international players declared as early entry candidates. At the withdrawal deadline, 48 early entry candidates withdrew from the draft, leaving 50 collegiate players and five international players as the early entry candidates for the draft.

A player who has hired an agent will forfeit his remaining college eligibility, regardless of whether he is drafted. Also, while the CBA allows a player to withdraw from the draft twice, the NCAA mandates that a player who has declared twice loses his college eligibility. This second provision affected Mac Koshwal, Gani Lawal, and Patrick Patterson, all of whom declared for and withdrew from the 2009 draft.

This draft was expected to see an unusual influx of underclassmen, even compared with recent years, for reasons explained by ESPN.com columnist Eamonn Brennan in an April 2010 piece:

Early entrants

College underclassmen
The following college basketball players successfully applied for early draft entrance.

  Solomon Alabi – C, Florida State (sophomore)
  Cole Aldrich – C/F, Kansas (junior)
 / Al-Farouq Aminu – F, Wake Forest (sophomore)
  James Anderson – G, Oklahoma State (junior)
  Luke Babbitt – F, Nevada (sophomore)
  Armon Bassett – G, Ohio (junior)
  Eric Bledsoe – G, Kentucky (freshman)
  Dee Bost – G, Mississippi State (junior)
  Craig Brackins – F, Iowa State (junior)
  Avery Bradley – G, Texas (freshman)
  Derrick Caracter – F, UTEP (junior)
  DeMarcus Cousins – F, Kentucky (freshman)
  Jordan Crawford – G, Xavier (sophomore)
  Ed Davis – F, North Carolina (sophomore)
  Devin Ebanks – F, West Virginia (sophomore)
  Derrick Favors – F, Georgia Tech (freshman)
  Courtney Fortson – G, Arkansas (sophomore)
  Tiny Gallon – F, Oklahoma (freshman)
  Charles García – F, Seattle (junior)
  Paul George – F, Fresno State (sophomore)
  Manny Harris – G, Michigan (junior)
  Gordon Hayward – F, Butler (sophomore)
  Xavier Henry – G, Kansas (freshman)
  Darington Hobson – F, New Mexico State (junior)
  Armon Johnson – G, Nevada (junior)
  Wesley Johnson – F, Syracuse (junior)
  Dominique Jones – G, South Florida (junior)
  Mac Koshwal – F, DePaul (junior)
  Sylven Landesberg – G, Virginia (sophomore)
 / Gani Lawal – F, Georgia Tech (junior)
  Tommy Mason-Griffin – G, Oklahoma (freshman)
  Elijah Millsap – F, UAB (junior)
  Greg Monroe – F, Georgetown (sophomore)
  Andrew Ogilvy – C, Vanderbilt (junior)
  Daniel Orton – F/C, Kentucky (freshman)
  Patrick Patterson – F, Kentucky (junior)
  Samardo Samuels – F, Louisville (sophomore)
  Larry Sanders – F, VCU (junior)
  John Sloan – G, Huntingdon (junior)
  Lance Stephenson – G, Cincinnati (freshman)
  Lazar Trifunovic – F, Radford (junior)
  Evan Turner – G, Ohio State (junior)
 / Ekpe Udoh – F, Baylor (junior)
  John Wall – G, Kentucky (freshman)
  Willie Warren – G, Oklahoma (sophomore)
  C. J. Webster – F, San Jose State (junior)
  Terrico White – G, Ole Miss (sophomore)
  Hassan Whiteside – C, Marshall (freshman)
  Elliot Williams – G, Memphis (sophomore)
  Stevy Worah-Ozimo – F, Slippery Rock (junior)
  Jahmar Young – G, New Mexico State (junior)

International players
The following international players successfully applied for early draft entrance.

  Thomas Heurtel – G, SIG Strasbourg (France)
  Dusan Korac – F, KK Centar (Montenegro)
  Tibor Pleiß – C, Brose Baskets (Germany)
  Ryan Richards – F, CB Gran Canaria (Spain)
  Kevin Séraphin – F, Cholet Basket (France)

Draft lottery

The first 14 picks in the draft belonged to teams which had missed the playoffs; the order was determined through a lottery. The lottery determined the three teams that would obtain the first three picks on the draft. The remaining first-round picks and the second-round picks were assigned to teams in reverse order of their win–loss record in the previous season. As it is commonplace in the event of identical win–loss records, the NBA performed a random drawing to break the ties on April 16, 2010.

The lottery was held on May 18, 2010 in Secaucus, New Jersey. The Washington Wizards and Philadelphia 76ers beat the statistical odds by winning the first and second overall picks respectively. The New Jersey Nets won the third overall pick.

Below were the chances for each team to get specific picks in the 2010 draft lottery, rounded to three decimal places:

Trades involving draft picks

Pre-draft trades
Prior to the day of the draft, the following trades were made and resulted in exchanges of draft picks between the teams.
 On February 12, 2004, Utah acquired Tom Gugliotta, New York's 2004 and 2010 first-round picks, a 2005 second-round pick and cash considerations from Phoenix in exchange for Keon Clark and Ben Handlogten. Previously, Phoenix acquired Antonio McDyess, Howard Eisley, Charlie Ward, Maciej Lampe, the draft rights to Miloš Vujanić, two first-round picks and cash considerations on January 5, 2004 from New York in exchange for Stephon Marbury, Penny Hardaway and Cezary Trybański.
 On February 18, 2010, Milwaukee acquired John Salmons, 2011 and 2012 second-round picks and the option to swap 2010 first-round picks from Chicago in exchange for Hakim Warrick and Joe Alexander. The option to swap 2010 first-round picks was exercised, hence Milwaukee acquired Chicago's first-round pick and Chicago acquired Milwaukee's first-round pick.
 On June 25, 2009, Minnesota acquired Charlotte's first-round pick from Denver in exchange for the draft rights to Ty Lawson. Previously, Denver acquired a first-round pick on June 25, 2008 from Charlotte in exchange for the 20th pick in the 2008 Draft.
 On June 23, 2010, Oklahoma City acquired Daequan Cook and the 18th pick in the 2010 Draft from Miami in exchange for the 32nd pick in the 2010 Draft. Previously, Oklahoma City acquired Etan Thomas and two second-round picks on July 27, 2009 from Minnesota in exchange for Damien Wilkins and Chucky Atkins. Previously, Minnesota acquired a second-round pick and cash considerations on June 25, 2009 from Dallas in exchange for the draft rights to Nick Calathes. Previously, Dallas acquired a second-round pick, the 24th and 56th picks in the 2009 Draft on June 24, 2009 from Portland in exchange for the 22nd pick in the 2009 Draft.
 On July 9, 2008, Minnesota acquired Rodney Carney, Calvin Booth, Utah's first-round pick and cash considerations from Philadelphia in exchange for a conditional second-round pick. Previously, Philadelphia acquired Gordan Giriček and a first-round pick on December 29, 2007 from Utah in exchange for Kyle Korver.
 On August 7, 2009, Memphis acquired Steven Hunter, a first-round pick and cash considerations from Denver in exchange for a conditional second-round pick.
 On July 20, 2007, Oklahoma City (as Seattle) acquired Kurt Thomas, 2008 and 2010 first-round picks from Phoenix in exchange for a 2009 second-round pick.
 On February 19, 2008, New Jersey acquired Devin Harris, Trenton Hassell, Maurice Ager, DeSagana Diop, Keith Van Horn, cash considerations, 2008 and 2010 first-round picks from Dallas in exchange for Jason Kidd, Antoine Wright and Malik Allen.
 On February 1, 2008, Memphis acquired Kwame Brown, Javaris Crittenton, Aaron McKie, the draft rights to Marc Gasol, cash considerations, 2008 and 2010 first-round picks from L.A. Lakers in exchange for Pau Gasol and a second-round pick.
 On February 17, 2010, Washington acquired Žydrūnas Ilgauskas, the draft rights to Emir Preldžič and a first-round pick from Cleveland in a three-team trade with Cleveland and the L.A. Clippers.
 On June 22, 2010, Milwaukee acquired Corey Maggette and the 44th pick in the 2010 Draft from Golden State in exchange for Charlie Bell and Dan Gadzuric. Previously, Golden State acquired the 44th pick in the 2010 Draft and cash considerations on June 21, 2010 from Portland in exchange for the 34th pick in the 2010 Draft. Previously, Portland acquired 2009 and 2010 second-round picks from Chicago in a three-team trade on June 26, 2008.
 On February 18, 2010, Milwaukee acquired Primož Brezec, Royal Ivey and a second-round pick from Philadelphia in exchange for Francisco Elson and Jodie Meeks.
 On July 28, 2008, New York acquired Taurean Green, Bobby Jones and a second-round pick from Denver in exchange for Renaldo Balkman and cash considerations. Previously, the L.A. Clippers acquired Marcus Camby on July 15, 2008 from Denver in exchange for the option to swap 2010 second-round picks. The options to swap 2010 second-round picks was exercised, hence New York acquired L.A. Clippers' second-round pick via Denver and the L.A. Clippers acquired Denver's second-round pick.
 On June 25, 2009, Miami acquired 2010 and 2012 second-round picks from New Orleans in exchange for the draft rights to Marcus Thornton.
 On June 13, 2009, Miami acquired Jermaine O'Neal, Jamario Moon, a future first-round pick and a 2010 second-round pick from Toronto in exchange for Shawn Marion, Marcus Banks and cash considerations.
 On February 21, 2008, Minnesota acquired Kirk Snyder, a second-round pick and cash considerations from Houston in exchange for Gerald Green.
 On December 10, 2008, Phoenix acquired Jason Richardson, Jared Dudley and a second-round pick from Charlotte in exchange for Raja Bell, Boris Diaw and Sean Singletary.
 On June 25, 2009, Dallas acquired the draft rights to Rodrigue Beaubois and a second-round pick from Oklahoma City in exchange for the draft rights to Byron Mullens.
 On December 29, 2009, Minnesota acquired Alando Tucker, a second-round pick and cash considerations from Phoenix in exchange for Jason Hart.
 On October 10, 2008, Indiana acquired Eddie Jones, cash considerations, 2009 and 2010 second-round picks from Dallas in exchange for Shawne Williams.
 On June 25, 2009, Phoenix acquired Ben Wallace, Aleksandar Pavlović, a second-round pick and cash considerations from Cleveland in exchange for Shaquille O'Neal.

Draft-day trades

The following trades involving drafted players were made on the day of the draft.

 Oklahoma City acquired Morris Peterson and the draft rights to 11th pick Cole Aldrich from New Orleans in exchange for the draft rights to 21st pick Craig Brackins and 26th pick Quincy Pondexter. The trade was finalized on July 8, 2010, after the new salary cap went into effect and the league moratorium period concluded.
 Portland acquired Ryan Gomes and the draft rights to 16th pick Luke Babbitt from Minnesota in exchange for Martell Webster.
 Washington acquired Kirk Hinrich, the draft rights to 17th pick Kevin Seraphin and cash considerations from Chicago in exchange for the draft rights to Vladimir Veremeenko. The trade was finalized on July 8, 2010, after the new salary cap went into effect and the league moratorium period concluded.
 The L.A. Clippers acquired the draft rights to 18th pick Eric Bledsoe from Oklahoma City in exchange for a future conditional first-round pick.
 Washington acquired the draft rights to 23rd pick Trevor Booker and 56th pick Hamady N'Diaye from Minnesota in exchange for the draft rights to 30th pick Lazar Hayward and 35th pick Nemanja Bjelica.
 New Jersey acquired the draft rights to 24th pick Damion James from Atlanta in exchange for the draft rights to 27th pick Jordan Crawford and 31st pick Tibor Pleiß.
 Dallas acquired the draft rights to 25th pick Dominique Jones from Memphis Grizzlies in exchange for cash considerations.
 Oklahoma City acquired the draft rights to 31st pick Tibor Pleiß from Atlanta in exchange for cash considerations.
 New York acquired the draft rights to 44th pick Jerome Jordan from Milwaukee in exchange for cash considerations. The trade was finalized on July 8, 2010.
 Oklahoma City acquired the draft rights to 48th pick Latavious Williams from Miami in exchange for a future second-round pick.
 Toronto acquired the draft rights to 50th pick Solomon Alabi from Dallas in exchange for a 2013 conditional second-round pick and cash considerations.
 Indiana acquired the draft rights to 51st pick Magnum Rolle from Oklahoma City in exchange for the draft rights to 57th pick Ryan Reid and cash considerations.

See also
 List of first overall NBA draft picks

References
General

Specific

External links

2010 NBA Draft – ESPN

Draft
National Basketball Association draft
NBA draft
NBA draft
2010s in Manhattan
Basketball in New York City
Sporting events in New York City
Sports in Manhattan
Madison Square Garden